Attorney General Griffith may refer to:

Samuel Griffith (1845–1920), Attorney-General of Queensland
William Brandford Griffith (judge) (1858–1939), Attorney General of the Colony of Jamaica
William Downes Griffith (1829–1908), Attorney General of the Cape Colony

See also
John Calvert Griffiths (born 1931), Attorney General of Hong Kong